Sargodha Junction railway station is located in the city of Sargodha, Punjab province of Pakistan. It is one of the important railway stations of Pakistan Railways and serves as the junction between the Shorkot–Lalamusa Branch Line and Sangla Hill–Kundian Branch Line.

Facilities 
Sargodha Junction Station is equipped with all basic facilities. The station has current and advance reservation offices for Pakistan Railways with retail shops are found on the platform, including restaurants.

Services
The following trains stop at Sargodha Junction station:

See also
 List of railway stations in Pakistan
 Pakistan Railways

References

External links

Sargodha
Railway stations on Sangla Hill–Kundian Branch Line
Railway stations in Sargodha District
Railway stations on Shorkot–Lalamusa Branch Line